Nonna M. Karakashyan (née Nonna M. Avanesova; ; born February 13, 1940) was the first Armenian woman awarded with FIDE title of International Arbiter (1992).  She is a chess player and coach. Her last name may also be spelled as Karakashian.

Nonna Karakashyan was a student of Honoured Trainer Suren Abramian. She was three-time women chess champion of Azerbaijan (1961,1963,1964) and national team member in 1955–1964. She earned a Bachelor in Engineering degree.

In 1979 Karakashyan founded "Trudovye Reservy" chess club in Baku, Azerbaijan, the very first chess club in the USSR for students of vocational technical schools. 

In 1991–1992 Nonna Karakashyan held a position of a Deputy Director of Executive Committee of Armenian Chess Federation.

Nonna Karakashyan was Chief Arbiter of the finale tournament of the 51st USSR Women Open Championship (Lviv, Ukraine, 1991), arbiter of the Women World Candidate Tournament (Tskhaltubo, Republic of Georgia, 1988), the World Chess Olympiads (Moscow, Russia, 1994 and Yerevan, Armenia, 1996) and several Tigran Petrosian Memorial Tournaments (1984–1991, Armenia).

At present, Nonna Karakashyan teaches chess classes  in Edison, New Jersey (USA).

Her daughter, Narine Karakashian, is a chess Woman International Master, currently and has a psychology doctorate.
Both mother and daughter were awarded with international chess titles (IA and WIM respectively) at the 1992 FIDE Congress in Manila, Philippines.

Publications
 «Trainer who was a Role Model…» (2000), memoirs about Suren Abramian  originally published at КasparovChess.ru  /in Russian/
 Շախմատաին Հայաստան / «Шахматная Армения» / Chess in Armenia magazine -  articles (1983—1992) /in Armenian and Russian/
 «Голос Армении» / Voice of Armenia newspaper - chess columnist (1983–1992) /in Russian/.

External links
 
 Chess classes in New Jersey — website of Nonna Karakashyan
 School Plus -  Sunday school in New Jersey
 The History of Chess in Azerbaijan  /in Russian/
 «Armenian Stars of Baku Sport» — Noev Kovcheg magazine, 2008, # 8 (131)  /in Russian/.
 «The Dream of My Life» - interview with Nonna Karakashyan  /in Russian/.
 «When we were young…» -  interview with Nonna Karakashyan about Woman International Grandmaster Tatiana Zatulovskaya  /in Russian/.
 «First Chess Teacher of Levon Aronian» -  Nonna Karakashyan's article about Ludmila Finareva Noev Kovcheg magazine, 2013, # 14 (220)  /in Russian/.
 «From New Year Mail», about chess classes of Nonna Karakashyan in New Jersey  /in Russian/.
 Alexander Sarychev, "Nice Debut", "Proftekhobrazovanie" magazine (USSR), 1981, # 3 (430), p. 54  /in Russian/.
 Nonna Karakashyan interview for Chess Retro YouTube channel (in Russian) - June 22, 2021.

1940 births
Living people
Russian female chess players
Soviet chess players
Armenian female chess players
Chess coaches
Chess arbiters
Armenian emigrants to the United States
Chess players from Baku